The Diocese of Guadalcanal is one of the nine current dioceses of the Anglican Church of Melanesia. It was founded on 23 June 2013.

The diocese was erected from the Diocese of Central Solomons and inaugurated at St Paul's Chapel, Legalau village, Tasiboko; it covers an area from beyond Lunga Bridge on the east and to beyond White River Bridge on the west of Honiara. St Paul's Chapel has become the diocesan cathedral.

List of bishops

References

Sources
Anglican Church of Melanesia — Diocese of Guadalcanal

 
Guadalcanal, Diocese of
Melanesia
Christian organizations established in 2013
2013 establishments in Oceania